Olaf Hytten (3 March 1888 – 11 March 1955) was a Scottish actor. He appeared in more than 280 films between 1921 and 1955. He was born in Glasgow, Scotland, and died in Los Angeles, California from a heart attack, while sitting in his car in the parking lot at 20th Century Fox Studios. His remains are interred in an unmarked crypt, located in Santa Monica's Woodlawn Cemetery.

Filmography

 Demos (1921) - Daniel Dabbs (film debut)
 Money (1921) - Henry Graves
 The Knave of Diamonds (1921) - Sir Giles Carfax
 Sonia (1921) - Fatty Webster
 The Knight Errant (1922) - Hernando Perez
 Trapped by the Mormons (1922) - Elder Marz
 The Wonderful Story (1922) - Jimmy Martin
 The Crimson Circle (1922)
 The Missioner (1922) - Stephen Hurd
 His Wife's Husband (1922) - Fred Pearson
 A Gamble with Hearts (1923) - Dallas Jr.
 The Little Door Into the World (1923) - Mountebank
 Out to Win (1923) - Cumberston
 Chu-Chin-Chow (1923) - Mukhill
 The White Shadow (1924) - Herbert Barnes
 It Is the Law (1924) - Bill Elliott
 The Salvation Hunters (1925) - The Brute
 Marriage License? (1926) - Detective (uncredited)
 The Better 'Ole (1926) - German Officer (uncredited)
 Old Age Handicap (1928)
 Master and Man (1929) - Lord Overbury
 Kitty (1929) - Leaper
 City of Play (1929) - Schulz
 The Return of Dr. Fu Manchu (1930) - Deacon at Wedding (uncredited)
 Grumpy (1930) - Keble
 Playboy of Paris (1930) - Nightclub Waiter (uncredited)
 Along Came Youth (1930) - Minor Role (uncredited)
 Unfaithful (1931) - Minor Role (uncredited)
 Born to Love (1931) - Aide to Major General (uncredited)
 Forbidden Adventure (1931) - Florist (uncredited)
 Secrets of a Secretary (1931) - Court Reporter (uncredited)
 Daughter of the Dragon (1931) - Flinders the Butler (uncredited)
 Platinum Blonde (1931) - Mr. Radcliffe (uncredited)
 Under Eighteen (1931) - Penthouse Party Guest (uncredited)
 Peach O'Reno (1931) - Croupier (uncredited)
 Lovers Courageous (1932) - Perry (uncredited)
 Love Bound (1932) - Ship Passenger (uncredited)
 The Impatient Maiden (1932) - Doctor at Lecture (uncredited)
 Arsène Lupin (1932) - Party Guest (uncredited)
 The Wet Parade (1932) - Nightclubber Asking the Time (uncredited)
 Beauty and the Boss (1932) - Business Associate (uncredited)
 But the Flesh Is Weak (1932) - Party Guest (uncredited)
 The Man Called Back (1932) - Upper Level Court Clerk (uncredited)
 Crooner (1932) - Impatient Nightclub Patron (uncredited)
 The Night Club Lady (1932) - Walter - Colt's Butler (uncredited)
 The Eagle and the Hawk (1933) - Story-Telling Officer at Party (uncredited)
 A Study in Scarlet (1933) - Merrydew's Butler (uncredited)
 He Couldn't Take It (1933) - Professor Brewster Stevens (uncredited)
 Blind Adventure (1933) - Lady Rockingham's Butler (uncredited)
 The Masquerader (1933) - Doctor (uncredited)
 Berkeley Square (1933) - Sir Joshua Reynolds
 Design for Living (1933) - Englishman at Train (uncredited)
 The House on 56th Street (1933) - Peggy's Butler (uncredited)
 The Women in His Life (1933) - Page (uncredited)
 Lady Killer (1933) - Mr. Marley's Butler (uncredited)
 Mandalay (1934) - Cockney Purser (uncredited)
 The Mystery of Mr. X (1934) - Reporter (uncredited)
 Jimmy the Gent (1934) - Atlantis Steward (uncredited)
 Journal of a Crime (1934) - Victor - Butler (uncredited)
 Mystery Liner (1934) - Grimson's Aide (uncredited)
 Glamour (1934) - Dobbs (uncredited)
 Sisters Under the Skin (1934) - Butler
 The Key (1934) - First Regular (uncredited)
 Let's Talk It Over (1934) - Waiter (uncredited)
 Money Means Nothing (1934) - Parsons - the Butler (uncredited)
 Murder in the Private Car (1934) - Man Asking About Radio (uncredited)
 Whom the Gods Destroy (1934) - Purser of the Balkan (uncredited)
 Shock (1934) - Adjutant (uncredited)
 Jane Eyre (1934) - Jeweler (uncredited)
 Bulldog Drummond Strikes Back (1934) - Hotel Clerk (uncredited)
 The Moonstone (1934) - Dr. Ezra Jennings
 One Night of Love (1934) - Bill's Valet (uncredited)
 British Agent (1934)  - Under Secretary Avery (uncredited)
 The Richest Girl in the World  (1934) - Valet (uncredited)
 Happiness Ahead (1934) - Bradford's Butler (uncredited)
 What Every Woman Knows (1934) - Meeting Chairman (uncredited)
 Girl o' My Dreams (1934) - Prof. E. Phlatt (uncredited)
 The Painted Veil (1934) - Dr. Somerset (uncredited)
 Secret of the Chateau (1934) - LaFarge (uncredited)
 Strange Wives (1934) - Jim's Butler
 Red Morning (1934) - McTavish
 The Little Minister (1934) - Cruickshank - Villager (uncredited)
 Clive of India (1935) - Parson at Hustine (uncredited)
 After Office Hours (1935) - Patterson's Butler (uncredited)
 Vanessa: Her Love Story (1935) - Herries Family Member (uncredited)
 Traveling Saleslady (1935) - Twitchell's Butler (uncredited)
 The Florentine Dagger (1935) - Scotland Yard Radio Operator (uncredited)
 Les Misérables (1935) - Pierre (uncredited)
 Mister Dynamite (1935) - Police Chemist (uncredited)
 Becky Sharp (1935) - The Prince Regent
 Going Highbrow (1935) - Watkins - Butler (uncredited)
 Bonnie Scotland (1935) - Scottish Recruiting Sergeant (uncredited)
 Atlantic Adventure (1935) - Ship's Doctor (uncredited)
 Anna Karenina (1935) - Butler (uncredited)
 The Dark Angel (1935) - Mills (uncredited)
 Two Sinners (1935) - French Judge
 His Night Out (1935) - Butler (uncredited)
 She Couldn't Take It (1935) - Van Dyke Butler (uncredited)
 The Spanish Cape Mystery (1935) - DuPre
 The Last Outpost (1935) - Doctor (uncredited)
 Metropolitan (1935) - Male Modiste (uncredited)
 A Feather in Her Hat (1935) - Taxi Driver (uncredited)
 I Found Stella Parish (1935) - Robert - Stephan's Butler (uncredited)
 Ship Cafe (1935) - Butler (uncredited)
 Thanks a Million (1935) - Byron (uncredited)
 The Widow from Monte Carlo (1935) - Englishman at Casino (uncredited)
 Sylvia Scarlett (1935) - Customs Inspector (uncredited)
 The Lone Wolf Returns (1935) - Bancrofts' Butler (uncredited)
 The Garden Murder Case (1936) - Vance's Butler (uncredited)
 Sutter's Gold (1936) - Johann, Waiter (uncredited)
 Doughnuts and Society (1936) - Wellington
 The House of a Thousand Candles (1936) - Sergeant
 And So They Were Married (1936) - Secretary (uncredited)
 Sons o' Guns (1936) - Sentry (uncredited)
 Trouble for Two (1936) - Butler (uncredited)
 The White Angel (1936) - Orderly in Dr. Hunt's Office (uncredited)
 Shakedown (1936) - Butler (uncredited)
 The Last of the Mohicans (1936) - King George II
 Libeled Lady (1936) - Reporter (uncredited)
 The Charge of the Light Brigade (1936) - Officer (uncredited)
 House of Secrets (1936) - Wilson (uncredited)
 Love Letters of a Star (1936) - Thompson
 Lloyd's of London (1936) - Telescope Man (uncredited)
 White Hunter (1936) - Barton
 With Love and Kisses (1936) - Dickson
 Camille (1936) - Baccarat Croupier (uncredited)
 The Good Earth (1937) - Liu - Grain Merchant
 We Have Our Moments (1937) - Steward (uncredited)
 California Straight Ahead! (1937) - Huggins
 Parnell (1937) - House of Commons Member (uncredited)
 Dangerous Holiday (1937) - Popcorn
 The Emperor's Candlesticks (1937) - Conspirator (uncredited)
 I Cover the War! (1937) - Sir Herbert
 Easy Living (1937) - Joseph aka Justin - Houseman (uncredited)
 Souls at Sea (1937) - Proprietor (uncredited)
 Double or Nothing (1937) - Eustace the Butler (uncredited)
 Lancer Spy (1937) - Barber (uncredited)
 Angel (1937) - Consolidated Press Photographer (uncredited)
 Conquest (1937) - Conspirator (uncredited)
 The Great Garrick (1937) - Ambassador in 'Hamlet' (uncredited)
 Ebb Tide (1937) - English Tourist (uncredited)
 First Lady (1937) - Bleeker
 Bluebeard's Eighth Wife (1938) - Store President's Valet (uncredited)
 The Adventures of Robin Hood (1938) - Outlaw (uncredited)
 The Lone Wolf in Paris (1938) - Jenkins
 Lord Jeff (1938) - Instructor (uncredited)
 Blond Cheat (1938) - Paul Douglas
 Marie Antoinette (1938) - Monsieur Boehmer - the Jeweler (uncredited)
 Secrets of an Actress (1938) - Reynolds - Peter's Butler (uncredited)
 Arrest Bulldog Drummond (1938) - Island Police Arresting Sergeant (uncredited)
 Up the River (1938) - Ship Steward (uncredited)
 A Christmas Carol (1938) - Schoolmaster (uncredited)
 Zaza (1938) - Waiter (uncredited)
 The Little Princess (1939) - Pedestrian Discussing the War (uncredited)
 The Lady and the Mob (1939) - Brewster - Hattie's Butler (uncredited)
 Broadway Serenade (1939) - Hotel Manager (uncredited)
 The Flying Irishman (1939) - Irish Airport Radio Operator (uncredited)
 Man of Conquest (1939) - Footman (uncredited)
 The Sun Never Sets (1939) - Statesman (uncredited)
 6,000 Enemies (1939) - Prison Photographer (uncredited)
 Andy Hardy Gets Spring Fever (1939) - Mr. Higgenbotham
 Our Leading Citizen (1939) - Charles, the Butler
 Rio (1939) - Banker (uncredited)
 The Great Commandment (1939) - Nathan
 Pride of the Blue Grass (1939) - Spectator (uncredited)
 Mr. Smith Goes to Washington (1939) - Butler (uncredited)
 Television Spy (1939) - Wagner - Llewellyn's Butler
 Little Accident (1939) - Meggs (uncredited)
 Rulers of the Sea (1939) - Third Secretary (uncredited)
 Allegheny Uprising (1939) - General Gage
 Our Neighbors – The Carters (1939) - Butler (uncredited)
 We Are Not Alone (1939) - Mr. Clark (uncredited)
 The Earl of Chicago (1940) - Hodges (uncredited)
 Calling Philo Vance (1940) - Charles (uncredited)
 Parole Fixer (1940) - Carter, Butler (uncredited)
 Drums of Fu Manchu (1940, Serial) - Dr. Flinders Petrie
 Gaucho Serenade (1940) - Norton School Headmaster (uncredited)
 Escape to Glory (1940) - Agent
 Captain Caution (1940) - Stannage's Officer Aide (uncredited)
 No Time for Comedy (1940) - Pearson (uncredited)
 The Howards of Virginia (1940) - Witt (uncredited)
 Arise, My Love (1940) - Employee (uncredited)
 Rage in Heaven (1941) - Hotel Clerk (uncredited)
 Footsteps in the Dark (1941) - Horace - Warren's Butler (uncredited)
 That Hamilton Woman (1941) - Gavin
 Washington Melodrama (1941) - Parry
 All the World's a Stooge (1941, Short) - Botters - Butler (uncredited)
 For Beauty's Sake (1941) - Father McKinley
 Man Hunt (1941) - Piel - Saul's Law Clerk (uncredited)
 Blondie in Society (1941) - Butler (uncredited)
 The Bride Came C.O.D. (1941) - Winfield's Valet (uncredited)
 Dr. Jekyll and Mr. Hyde (1941) - Hobson (uncredited)
 When Ladies Meet (1941) - Matthews (uncredited)
 Nine Lives Are Not Enough (1941) - Richards - Jane's Butler (uncredited)
 Passage from Hong Kong (1941) - British Official (uncredited)
 The Blonde from Singapore (1941) - Doorman (uncredited)
 The Wolf Man (1941) - Villager (uncredited)
 Bedtime Story (1941) - Alfred
 Son of Fury: The Story of Benjamin Blake (1942) - Court Clerk (uncredited)
 To Be or Not to Be (1942) - Polonius in Warsaw (uncredited)
 The Ghost of Frankenstein (1942) - Hussman
 The Affairs of Jimmy Valentine (1942) - Butler
 A Gentleman After Dark (1942) - Butler (uncredited)
 You're Telling Me (1942) - Fielding (uncredited)
 This Above All (1942) - Proprietor (uncredited)
 Spy Ship (1942) - Drake, the Butler
 Eagle Squadron (1942) - Day Controller
 The Voice of Terror (1942) - Fabian Prentiss
 Destination Unknown (1942) - Wing Fu
 Lucky Jordan (1942) - Charles the Servant (uncredited)
 Casablanca (1942) - Pickpocketed Prosperous Man (uncredited)
 The Black Swan (1942) - Clerk Reading Proclamation (uncredited)
 Journey for Margaret (1942) - Hotel Manager (uncredited)
 The Great Impersonation (1942) - Faye, Tobacco Shop Owner (uncredited)
 Happy Go Lucky (1943) - Jeweler (uncredited)
 The Gorilla Man (1943) - Hospital attendant (uncredited)
 Silent Witness (1943) - Sidney
 London Blackout Murders (1943) - Court Usher - Bailiff (uncredited)
 The Amazing Mrs. Holliday (1943) - Cable Office Clerk (uncredited)
 Hit Parade of 1943 (1943) - Waiter (uncredited)
 Mission to Moscow (1943) - Parliament Member (uncredited)
 Holy Matrimony (1943) - Cockney (uncredited)
 Sherlock Holmes Faces Death (1943) - Captain MacIntosh
 Flesh and Fantasy (1943) - Chemist (uncredited)
 The Return of the Vampire (1943) - Ben - Lady Jane's Butler (uncredited)
 The Lodger (1944) - Harris - The Haberdasher (uncredited)
 Passport to Destiny (1944) - Mr. Hawkins (uncredited)
 Detective Kitty O'Day (1944) - Butler
 The Scarlet Claw (1944) - Hotel Day Desk Clerk (uncredited)
 Ministry of Fear (1944) - Tailor's Shop Clerk (uncredited)
 The Invisible Man's Revenge (1944) - Gray - a Cabman (uncredited)
 Leave It to the Irish (1944) - The Hamilton Butler
 Oh, What a Night (1944) - Wyndy
 Our Hearts Were Young and Gay (1944) - Deck Steward (uncredited)
 Babes on Swing Street (1944) - William (uncredited)
 House of Frankenstein (1944) - Hoffman
 National Velvet (1944) - Villager (uncredited)
 The Suspect (1944) - Mr. Jevne (uncredited)
 A Guy, a Gal and a Pal (1945) - Butler (uncredited)
 The Brighton Strangler (1945) - Banks - the valet
 The Woman in Green (1945) - Norris - Fenwick's Butler (uncredited)
 Christmas in Connecticut (1945) - Elkins (uncredited)
 Scotland Yard Investigator (1945) - Purvis (uncredited)
 Pursuit to Algiers (1945) - Stimson (uncredited)
 Confidential Agent (1945) - Harry Bates (uncredited)
 Hold That Blonde (1945) - Charles (uncredited)
 My Name Is Julia Ross (1945) - The Reverend Lewis (uncredited)
 Three Strangers (1946) - Prison Turnkey (uncredited)
 The Notorious Lone Wolf (1946) - Prince of Rapur (uncredited)
 She-Wolf of London (1946) - Constable Alfred (uncredited)
 Dressed to Kill (1946) - Alfred - Auction House Bookkeeper (uncredited)
 Holiday in Mexico (1946) - (uncredited)
 Black Beauty (1946) - Mr. Gordon
 The Verdict (1946) - Sergeant (uncredited)
 Magnificent Doll (1946) - Blennerhassett (uncredited)
 Alias Mr. Twilight (1946) - Eckles
 That Way with Women (1947) - Davis
 The Ghost Goes Wild (1947) - Manservant (uncredited)
 Bells of San Angelo (1947) - Lionel Bates
 The Private Affairs of Bel Ami (1947) - Keeper of the Seals
 The Imperfect Lady (1947) - Butler (uncredited)
 Unconquered (1947) - Officer on 'Star of London' (uncredited)
 If Winter Comes (1947) - Officer at Inquest (uncredited)
 The Shanghai Chest (1948) - Bates - the Butler
 Kidnapped (1948) - The Red Fox
 A Connecticut Yankee in King Arthur's Court (1949) - Tailor (uncredited)
 The Secret of St. Ives (1949) - Defense Officer (uncredited)
 Challenge to Lassie (1949) - Reeves (uncredited)
 That Forsyte Woman (1949) - Gallery Assistant in London (uncredited)
 Rogues of Sherwood Forest (1950) - Charcoal Burner (uncredited)
 Fancy Pants (1950) - Stage Manager (uncredited)
 Kim (1950) - Mr. Fairlee (uncredited)
 Anne of the Indies (1951) - Capt. Harris (uncredited)
 The Son of Dr. Jekyll (1951) - Prosecutor (uncredited)
 Les Misérables (1952) - Judge (uncredited)
 Million Dollar Mermaid (1952) - Minor Role (uncredited)
 Against All Flags (1952) - King William (uncredited)
 Perils of the Jungle (1953) - Mac
 Fort Ti (1953) - Governor (uncredited)
 The Scarlet Coat (1955) - Maj. Andre's Butler (uncredited)

References

External links

1888 births
1955 deaths
20th-century Scottish male actors
Male actors from Glasgow
Burials at Woodlawn Memorial Cemetery, Santa Monica
British expatriate male actors in the United States
Scottish male film actors
Scottish male silent film actors